The Perth Central Area Transit (Perth CAT) system, or simply CAT, consists of five bus routes in the centre of Perth, one bus route in Fremantle, and three bus routes in Joondalup. Similar services exist in Rockingham (the City Centre Transit System) and Midland (the Midland Gate Shuttle). Unlike all other Transperth services, most CAT routes are free.

Perth CAT
On 23 September 1996, MetroBus commenced operating two CAT routes: the Red CAT and the Blue CAT, replacing the City Clipper services that had operated since September 1973. The Yellow CAT was commenced in 2002 and the Green CAT route began on 30 June 2013. The Purple CAT commenced on 27 February 2022. These CAT services are operated by Transdev WA.

Initially Perth CAT buses stopped at every stop, but with the introduction of the Purple CAT service passengers are now required to hail incoming buses and press the bell if they wish to alight.

Blue CAT

The Blue CAT runs between Perth and Northbridge with services extending to Kings Park during day time.

Red CAT

The Red CAT runs between West Perth and East Perth as bus route number 2. During peak times a shorter Red CAT travels between the Forrest Place stop opposite Perth railway station and the West Perth stop as bus route number 4 to meet high demand for travel between these. In addition, the West Perth Loop of the Red CAT travels from Perth Underground to Raine Square.

Yellow CAT

The Yellow CAT, introduced on 15 December 2002, runs between East Perth and West Perth as bus route number 3.

Green CAT

The Green CAT commenced on 1 July 2013, and runs between Leederville railway station and Elizabeth Quay Bus Station as bus route number 5. Intended to ease congestion in the central business district, the Green CAT does not run on weekends nor on public holidays.

Purple CAT

The Purple CAT commenced on 27 February 2022, and runs between the University of Western Australia and Elizabeth Quay Bus Station via the Queen Elizabeth II Medical Centre.

Fremantle CAT
The Fremantle CAT, which commenced on 26 August 2000, now comprises the Fremantle Blue CAT only, with the Red CAT being scrapped due to the COVID-19 pandemic. The Fremantle CAT services are operated by Transdev WA.

Joondalup CAT

The Joondalup CAT started operating on 9 January 2006. It is currently operated by Swan Transit since 20 January 2020. It runs Monday to Friday around the Joondalup central business district as bus routes 10 (anticlockwise) and 11 (clockwise).

On Mondays to Thursdays, Joondalup CAT also runs around the Joondalup Campus of Edith Cowan University as route 13, but only on the university's operating days.

Similar services

Rockingham City Centre Transit System
The Rockingham City Centre Shuttle started operation on 23 December 2007. It is the only CAT service that charges a fare. It travels between Rockingham railway station and Rockingham Centre. It runs as bus route 555.

Midland Gate Shuttle
The Midland Gate Shuttle started operation on 5 July 2009. It runs as route 300 and does not operate on Sundays and Public holidays. It travels in an anti-clockwise circle from Midland station around Midland Gate Shopping Centre and then back to Midland station.

Fleet

Perth CAT

Fremantle CAT

References

External links
Showbus gallery

Bus transport brands
Public transport in Perth, Western Australia
Zero-fare transport services
1996 establishments in Australia